Jean-Claude Van Johnson is an American action comedy-drama streaming television series starring Jean-Claude Van Damme and produced by Ridley Scott with his production studio Scott Free Productions and Amazon Studios. It premiered on August 19, 2016. On January 18, 2018, the series was cancelled after one season.

Premise
The story centers on retired martial arts and action movie star Jean-Claude Van Damme playing himself. It is revealed that the movie career and personal history of Jean-Claude Van Damme is all a cover story. He is actually a secret agent known as Jean-Claude Van Johnson, aided by his personal assistant and make-up specialist who are themselves covert operatives as well — his handler and weapons master, respectively. After being out of the spy business for five years, Jean-Claude runs into his former handler Vanessa (Kat Foster) and realizes how much he misses both their work together (which made him feel like a hero) and the relationship they had. He decides to go back into action, tracking down a major drug lord only to later realize he has found a larger threat, that of terrorists who possess a weather control machine.

The show's supporting cast includes Jean-Claude's manager Jane (Phylicia Rashad) who is in reality his superior and in charge of his covert operations agency. Joining Jean-Claude and Vanessa on the missions is new weapons specialist Luis (Moisés Arias), a former child soldier who wishes he actually was just a hairstylist and make-up artist. Jean-Claude's new cover involves agreeing to star in Huck, a violent action film reimagining of Huckleberry Finn. This forces Jean-Claude to constantly deal with Gunnar (Tim Peper), the movie's self-absorbed director, in between his spy work. Throughout the series, Jean-Claude runs across Filip (also played by Van Damme), a fan who coincidentally shares his face, and who eventually comes to hate him.

Throughout the series, Jean-Claude's fragile ego is a running gag, as even while undercover he cannot help but reference his own films repeatedly and is constantly disappointed when people fail to recognize him. Another running gag is that Jean-Claude constantly finds himself in situations from his movies others think are unrealistic, such as being surrounded by enemies who insist on attacking him one at a time or seemingly meeting a version of himself from the future.

Cast and characters

Main
Jean-Claude Van Damme as Johnson / Himself / Filip
Kat Foster	as Vanessa
Moisés Arias as Luis
Phylicia Rashad as Jane

Recurring
Tim Peper as Gunnar
Ian Fisher as Andrei
Carlo Rota as Dragan
Deren Tadlock as Victor
Winston James Francis as Meni Mano
Richard Schiff as Alan Morris
Daniel Bernhardt

Episodes

Production
The pilot episode for the series debuted on August 19, 2016. The concept was officially picked up on September 27, 2016, but was cancelled after one season.

References

External links
 

Television series by Amazon Studios
2017 American television series debuts
2017 American television series endings
2010s American comedy-drama television series
Amazon Prime Video original programming
Television series by Scott Free Productions